Pedro Will Hang is a 1941 German adventure film directed by Veit Harlan and starring Gustav Knuth, Heinrich George and Maria Landrock.

The film's sets were designed by the art directors Karl Machus and Erich Zander.

Cast
 Gustav Knuth as Pedro, Hirte
 Heinrich George as Manuel, Kellner
 Maria Landrock as Pepita
 Jakob Tiedtke as Der Alkalde
 Ursula Deinert as Chequita
 Werner Scharf as José, Pferdehändler
 Charlotte Witthauer as Alice Baker
 Trude Tandar as Miss Evelyne
 Erich Fiedler as Amadeo de Montessandro
 Ernst Legal as Plebejano
 Franz Weber as Rodrigo
 Marianne Simson as Mädchen
 Ernst Rotmund
 Otto F. Henning as Stadtbewohner
 Hans Meyer-Hanno as Stadtbewohner
 Jutta Jol as Stadtbewohnerin
 Marlise Ludwig as Stadtbewohnerin
 Mohamed Husen as Pfleger

Citations

References

External links 
 

1941 films
1941 adventure films
Films of Nazi Germany
German adventure films
1940s German-language films
Films directed by Veit Harlan
Films set in South America
Tobis Film films
German black-and-white films
1940s German films